Alexandru Mihăiță Novac (born 24 March 1997) is a Romanian athlete specialising in the javelin throw. He represented his country at the 2017 World Championships without qualifying for the final.

His personal best in the event is 86.37 metres set in Nembro, Italy in 2018. This is the current national record.

International competitions

References

1997 births
Living people
Romanian male javelin throwers
World Athletics Championships athletes for Romania
Athletes (track and field) at the 2014 Summer Youth Olympics
People from Adjud
Athletes (track and field) at the 2020 Summer Olympics
Olympic athletes of Romania